Bassendean is an electoral district of the Legislative Assembly in the Australian state of Western Australia.

The district is based in the eastern suburbs of Perth. It is a safe Labor seat.

Geography
Bassendean is a compact electorate situated east of the Perth CBD. The district is bordered to the south by Swan River, to the east by the Tonkin Highway and Beechboro Road North, to the north by the Reid Highway and to the west by Lord Street. It includes the suburbs of Bassendean, Ashfield, Eden Hill, Kiara, Lockridge, as well as parts of Beechboro, Bayswater, Bennett Springs, Caversham, Embleton and Morley.

History
Bassendean was first contested at the 1996 state election. The seat was won by Labor candidate Clive Brown, previously the member for Morley, which had been abolished. Brown was succeeded at the 2005 state election by Martin Whitely, previously member for the abolished Roleystone. Whitely retired at the 2013 election and was succeeded by union official Dave Kelly.

Members for Bassendean

Election results

References

External links
 ABC election profiles: 2005 2008
 WAEC district maps: current boundaries, previous distributions

Bassendean